Operation Atlantic Resolve, though not a "named" operation, refers to military activities in response to Russian operations in Ukraine; mainly the War in Donbass. It was funded under the European Deterrence Initiative. In the wake of Russia's 2014 intervention in Ukraine, the U.S. and the U.K. took several immediate steps to enhance the deterrence posture along the eastern flank of the North Atlantic Treaty Organization (NATO), including augmenting the air, ground and naval presence in the region, and enhancing previously scheduled exercises. The US described the activities as taking measures to enhance NATO military plans and defense capabilities and maintaining a persistent presence in Central Europe and Eastern Europe. Atlantic Resolve rotations are overseen by a regionally aligned headquarters there.

Airborne operations
On April 30, 2014 United States Army and Air Force military members were sent to Poland and the Baltic States of Latvia, Lithuania, and Estonia to conduct military exercises with partner nations in an immediate response to Russian illegal annexation of the Crimean Peninsula on March 18, 2014.  This was on done on a bilateral basis, not as part of a larger NATO action. The force consisted of four companies of approximately: 150 soldiers from the 173rd BCT (Brigade Combat Team, airborne) out of Vicenza, Italy and supporting Air Force JTACs (Joint Terminal Attack Controller) from the 2nd ASOS (Air Support Operations Squadron) out of Vilseck, Germany.  Troops were transported with assistance from the USAF 37th Airlift Squadron based out of Ramstein, Germany.  The four companies were rotated out every ninety days through the end of 2014 when a more formal version of Operation Atlantic Resolve was put into place.

Road march

In March 2015, a U.S. Army spokesman in Wiesbaden announced that a convoy of armored fighting vehicles (including Strykers) would – after manoeuvres in Poland, Latvia, Estonia and Lithuania – return via road to their garrison at Vilseck. The road march started a week later.

Assets

Aerial
The aerial assets are mostly deployed to Ämari Air Base, Graf Ignatievo Air Base, Mihail Kogălniceanu Air Base, Papa Air Base, and Illesheim Army Airfield.

Air Force

The first aerial units were the 159th Expeditionary Fighter Squadron (159th EFS) with McDonnell Douglas F-15C Eagle's and the 123d EFS with F-15C's and a single F-15D from April 2015 who stayed for six months.

This was added to by the following units:

 355th Fighter Wing = 354th EFS with 12 x Fairchild Republic A-10C Thunderbolt II's between February 13 and July 31, 2015 initially at Spangdahlem Air Base before forward deployed to an Eastern European Air base.
 442nd Fighter Wing = 303d EFS with 8 x A-10C Thunderbolt II's from August 22, 2015 at Amari.
 23d Fighter Group = 74th EFS with 12 x A-10C Thunderbolt II's between September 21, 2015 and March 18, 2016 at various bases.
 104th Fighter Wing = 131st EFS with F-15C's between April and September 2016.
 144th Fighter Wing = 194th EFS with F-15C's and D's from April 2016.
 122d Fighter Wing = 163d EFS with A-10C Thunderbolt II's until August 2016.
 442nd Fighter Wing = 303d EFS with A-10C Thunderbolt II's from July 2016.
 140th Wing = 120th EFS with F-16C between July 2016 and August 2016.
 48th Fighter Wing = 493d EFS with F-15C's between August and September 2016.
 144th Fighter Wing = 194th EFS with F-15C's between August and September 2016.
 125th Fighter Wing = 159th EFS with F-15C's between Unknown and August 2017.
 159th Fighter Wing = 122d EFS with F-15C's between Unknown and August 2017.
 180th Fighter Wing = 112th EFS with F-16's from January 2018.
 301st Fighter Wing = 457th EFS with F-16's from April 2019.

Army

 Task Force Brawler, 4th Battalion, 3rd Aviation Regiment, 3rd Combat Aviation Brigade (First RAF unit for OAR), from March 2015 to November 2015 
Task Force Spearhead, 3rd Battalion, 227th Aviation Regiment, 1st Air Cavalry Brigade, from November 2015 to August 2016.
Task Force Apocalypse, 3rd Battalion, 501st Aviation Regiment, 1st Armored Combat Aviation Brigade, from August 2016 to March 2017.
 10th Combat Aviation Brigade, 10th Mountain Division, from March 2017 to October 2017.
1st Battalion, 501st Aviation Regiment, 1AD CAB, Ft Bliss, TX (OPCON'd to 10th CAB, 25x AH-64s, 400x Soldiers)
 1st Air Cavalry Brigade, 1st Cavalry Division, from October 2017 to July 2018.
 4th Combat Aviation Brigade, 4th Infantry Division, from July 2018 to March 2019.
 1st Combat Aviation Brigade, 1st Infantry Division, from March 2019 to November 2019.
 3rd Combat Aviation Brigade, 3rd Infantry Division from November 2019 to July 2020.
 101st Combat Aviation Brigade, 101st Airborne Division from July 2020 to March 2021.
 1st Combat Aviation Brigade, 1st Infantry Division, from March 2021 to December 2021.
 1st Air Cavalry Brigade, 1st Cavalry Division, from December 2021 to September 2022.
 Combat Aviation Brigade, 1st Armored Division (United States) from September 2022 to May 2023.

Ground

As of January 2017, there are 3,500 troops from the 3rd Armored Brigade Combat Team, 4th Infantry Division, 87 tanks and 144 Bradley fighting vehicles there. They initially gathered in Poland, before spreading out across seven countries from Estonia to Bulgaria. The brigade is headquartered in Germany. An armored brigade will constantly rotate deployment every nine months. The equipment will be permanently based in Żagań in western Poland alongside a Polish armored division seemingly 34th Armoured Cavalry Brigade, 11th Armoured Cavalry Division. This unit has been replaced by 2nd Brigade Combat Team, 1st Infantry Division in September 2017. AS of May 2018, the rotational force has changed to 1st Armored Brigade Combat Team, 1st Cavalry Division. 1st Armored Brigade Combat Team, 1st Infantry Division completed their rotation during October 2019 and were replaced by 2nd Armored Brigade Combat Team, 1st Cavalry Division. 2BCT, 1CAV was replaced in approximately November or December 2020 by 1ABCT, 1CAV. In June, 2021 it was announced that 1ABCT, 1ID would replace 1ABCT, 1CAV in August 2021.

On 4 September 2020, the US Army deployed the 2nd Battalion of the 69th Armor Regiment, part of the 2nd Brigade Combat Team, 3rd Division, for training in Pabradė. They deployed with M1 Abrams, Bradley Fighting Vehicle, other vehicles, and material.

On 8 March 2022, V Corps' main headquarters forward deployed to Germany to provide additional command and control of U.S. Army forces in Europe as part of a larger personnel build up in response to the 2022 Russian invasion of Ukraine.

Reactions
82% of Czechs approved and supported the United States Army-NATO convoy that partook in Operation Dragoon Ride, according to an opinion poll that was conducted by the independent STEM agency in 2015.

A NATO deployment in the early January 2017 was welcomed by Polish officials who described it as a necessary response to Russian military exercises near its border and its military intervention in Ukraine and members of the public as the materiel crossed into south-western Poland from Germany. The same deployment sparked protests in Germany and prompted a critical reaction among the country’s centre-left political parties, but was defended by the country’s ruling Christian Democrat Party (CDU) coalition and German military officials. An article about the deployment that was published by the Donbas News International (DNI) agency and its subsequent circulation in the Western conspiracy-theory cybersphere and Russian mediasphere was cited as an example of the creation and spread of fake news. An editorial by the Pittsburgh Post-Gazette cautioned anyone against using the deployment as a domestic political tool.

See also
NATO Enhanced Forward Presence
Fort Trump

References

External links

 
 

2010s in Europe
Atlantic Resolve
Atlantic Resolve
Russia–United States relations
Ukraine–United States relations
War in Donbas